Hugh Delane "Rocky" Thompson (October 14, 1939 – March 13, 2021) was an American professional golfer who  played on the PGA Tour and the Champions Tour.

Thompson was born in Shreveport, Louisiana. He attended the University of Houston, and graduated in 1962. He turned pro in 1964. He played on the PGA Tour for many years but never recorded a victory. His best finish was a solo second place at the 1969 Western Open.

Thompson's fortunes changed, however, once he reached the age of 50 and began competing on the Senior PGA Tour in 1990. His first win came at the 1991 MONY Syracuse Senior Classic. Thompson, who had played a combined 611 events on the PGA Tour and Senior PGA Tour, without a victory, famously said his impassioned celebratory speech:

"But now if I never, ever win a PGA Tour event, right now, this minute, today, this week—" Thompson paused, his short soliloquy becoming louder with each enunciated syllable. He then hit his crescendo when he thrust his hips a little for effect, threw his fist in the air and yelled—screamed even— "I am the man!" 

Later that same year, he won at the Digital Seniors Classic. In 1994, he won the GTE Suncoast Classic. He holds or shares several Champions Tour records.

Thompson was mayor of Toco, Texas, in the 1990s. He died on March 13, 2021, at the age of 81.

Professional wins (4)

Regular wins (1) 

 1978 Greater Bangor Open

Senior PGA Tour wins (3)

See also
Spring 1978 PGA Tour Qualifying School graduates
Fall 1981 PGA Tour Qualifying School graduates

References

External links

American male golfers
Houston Cougars men's golfers
PGA Tour golfers
PGA Tour Champions golfers
Golfers from Shreveport, Louisiana
Golfers from Texas
People from Lamar County, Texas
Sportspeople from Plano, Texas
1939 births
2021 deaths